Fallou Njie (born 5 January 1999) is a Gambian football player.

Club career
He started his senior career in Italy on 7 December 2017, signing with Serie D club Chieri.

In the summer of 2018, he signed with Serie A club Genoa and was loaned to Arezzo in Serie C. He returned to Genoa in January 2019 without making any appearances for Arezzo and played for Genoa's Under-19 squad for the remainder of the season.

On 9 August 2019, he joined another Serie C club Avellino on a season-long loan. He made his professional Serie C debut for Avellino on 6 October 2019 in a game against Rende. He started the game and was substituted at half-time.

References

External links
 

1999 births
Living people
Sportspeople from Banjul
Gambian footballers
Association football defenders
S.S. Arezzo players
U.S. Avellino 1912 players
KF Skënderbeu Korçë players
Serie C players
Serie D players
Kategoria Superiore players
Gambian expatriate footballers
Expatriate footballers in Italy
Expatriate footballers in Albania